The Golden Meadow Lift Bridge crosses Bayou Lafourche in the town of Golden Meadow, Louisiana, and is the southern terminus of LA-308.  Built around 1970, this vertical-lift bridge has a total length of 204 feet with its largest span at 104 feet.  The bridge deck is 27.8 feet wide, and there is a vertical clearance above the deck of 22.5 feet.

References

Vertical lift bridges in Louisiana
Road bridges in Louisiana
Buildings and structures in Lafourche Parish, Louisiana